Micarla Araújo de Sousa Weber is a Brazilian journalist, politician and former mayor of Natal. She is Natal's second female mayor.

She is affiliated with the Green Party. She graduated with a degree in journalism from the Federal University of Rio Grande do Norte.

In 2004, she was elected vice-mayor of Natal plate in the then mayor Carlos Eduardo Alves. In 2006, resigned as vice mayor and applied the member state, the most voted. In 2008, applied for and was elected mayor. His term ends in 2012.

Natal was the first Brazilian capital in which the Green Party won a majority election.

See also
 List of mayors of Natal, Rio Grande do Norte

References

External links
  Official page

Living people
Mayors of Natal, Rio Grande do Norte
Women mayors of places in Brazil
Green Party (Brazil) politicians
Year of birth missing (living people)